The Masonic Hall in Gulfport, Mississippi, is a historic building that was designated a Mississippi Landmark in 2008.

Although there is a sign on the building indicating that it belongs to Rectitude Lodge No. 323 (Prince Hall Affiliation), none of the Prince Hall Grand Lodges in Mississippi lists a "Rectitude Lodge" on their current rosters.

References

Former Masonic buildings in Mississippi
Buildings and structures in Gulfport, Mississippi
Mississippi Landmarks